Woodface is the third studio album by New Zealand-Australian band Crowded House. The album was produced by Mitchell Froom and Neil Finn and was released by Capitol in July 1991. It features five singles "Chocolate Cake", "Fall at Your Feet", "It's Only Natural", "Weather with You", and "Four Seasons in One Day". Woodface was a major hit in Australia and New Zealand as well as giving the band their first top ten hit album in the UK. It was listed at No. 3 in the book 100 Best Australian Albums in October 2010. It was voted number 80 in the third edition of Colin Larkin's All Time Top 1000 Albums (2000).

Background
During a break from Crowded House following the Canadian leg of the tour in support of their second album, Temple of Low Men, band-leader Neil Finn began recording songs with his older brother and former Split Enz bandmate Tim Finn. These songs were originally intended for a Finn Brothers album. Once these sessions were complete, Neil teamed back up with Nick Seymour and Paul Hester to write and record Crowded House's third album. Capitol Records rejected most of the new Crowded House songs, so Neil asked Tim if the band could use some of the new Finn Brothers songs. Tim agreed, on condition that he would join the band, although he has since indicated he meant this as a joke. Whatever the truth of that claim, the group that returned to the studio included Tim as a full band member.

The album was titled Woodface and was released in July 1991. The cover was designed by Nick Seymour and Tommy Steele. It was co-produced by Mitchell Froom and Neil Finn, and mixed by Bob Clearmountain. Eight tracks were co-written by Neil and Tim Finn and mainly feature the brothers harmonising on lead vocals, although Neil takes the lead on "Four Seasons in One Day" and Tim sings "All I Ask", which later featured in AIDS awareness commercials in Australia. Five other tracks were solo compositions by Neil Finn and the remaining two were written by Paul Hester, including "I'm Still Here", a hidden track. Former Beach Boys drummer Ricky Fataar, and member of the Rutles, is credited on three of the Finn Brothers songs, "All I Ask", "There Goes God" and "Weather With You". The addition of Tim Finn and the inclusion of songs originally written for the Finn Brothers project gave the album a more upbeat and optimistic sound compared to its darkly personal predecessor, "represent[ing] the joy of reunion and the freedom of a collaborative effort", as Chris Woodstra of Allmusic remarked.

During the UK leg of the Woodface tour, Tim and the band parted company. Multi-instrumentalist Mark Hart, who had played some keyboards on Woodface, was recruited to replace Tim for the remaining dates. The final date of this tour at The Town & Country Club in London was recorded and given a limited release in Australia, while individual tracks were used as B-sides for the album's singles in other countries. The group described their work in the 2007 documentary Great Australian Albums.

Track listing

"I'm Still Here" follows "How Will You Go" in track 14 as a hidden track at 3:37 after 30 seconds silence. The version released as a hidden track in 1991 is an excerpt containing the first minute of the full track, which appears on the 2016 deluxe edition of the album.

The following songs were recorded by Crowded House for Woodface before Tim Finn became involved but were not included on the album. Seven appeared on the 1999 rarities collection Afterglow; "Fields Are Full of Your Kind" and "My Legs Are Gone" appeared on the bonus disc to the deluxe edition. "My Legs Are Gone" had previously been released on I Like It Rare, a rarities compilation available through Frenz of the Enz, the official Crowded House fan club. "Fields Are Full of Your Kind" remained unreleased until the deluxe edition of Woodface.

 "Anyone Can Tell"
 "Left Hand"
 "Dr. Livingstone"
 "Sacred Cow"
 "I Love You Dawn"
 "My Telly's Gone Bung"
 "Time Immemorial"
 "Fields Are Full of Your Kind"
 "My Legs Are Gone"

Several songs initially recorded by Tim and Neil were temporarily considered for "Woodface", but not used.  "Catherine Wheels" would be recorded for Together Alone later.

 "Catherine Wheels"
 "In Love With It All"
 "Strangeness and Charm"
 "Prodigal Son"
 "Cemetery in the Rain"

2016 reissue
Includes the original album for the first disc.

Notes
 * Previously released
 # features excerpts from "The Burglar's Song" (Neil Finn, Liam Finn), "Don't Dream It's Over" (Neil Finn), "When You Come" (Neil Finn), "Hole in the River" (Neil Finn, Eddie Rayner), "Money's No Object" (Tim Finn), "It's Only Natural" (Neil Finn, Tim Finn) and "Still Emotional" (Paul Hester).

Personnel
Crowded House
 Neil Finn – guitar, vocals, keyboards
 Tim Finn – piano, guitar, vocals
 Paul Hester – drums, vocals, keyboards, percussion
 Nick Seymour – bass guitar, vocals

Additional musicians

 Mitchell Froom – keyboards
 Mark Hart – additional keyboards
 Stuart Ellison – additional keyboards (5)
 David Hidalgo – accordion (11)
 Ricky Fataar – drums (5, 8, 10), percussion (5, 8, 10)
 Alex Acuña – additional percussion
 Geoffrey Hales – additional percussion
 Chris Wilson – harmonica (1, 4, 8)
 Peter Bucknell – violin (8)
 Vince Parsonage – viola (8)
 Jack Mack – brass
 Jorge Callendrelli – string arrangements and conductor (10)
 Sharon Finn – backing vocals (10)

Production

 Neil Finn – producer
 Mitchell Froom – producer
 Tchad Blake – engineer
 Paul Kosky – engineer (Periscope Studios)
 Rob Jaczko – second engineer (A&M Studios)
 Andrew Horne – second engineer (Periscope Studios)
 Max Garcia – second engineer (A&M Studios / Record Plant)
 Bob Clearmountain – mixing (A&M Studios / Record Plant)
 Bob Ludwig – mastering (Masterdisk)
 Nick Seymour – art direction, cover painting
 Tommy Steele – art direction
 Dennis Keeley – photography
 Stephen Walker – design
 Timothy Eames – letter construction
 Brenda Bentley – costumes

Charts

Weekly charts

Year-end charts

Certifications

Further reading

Notes and references

External links
Crowded House official website

1991 albums
Crowded House albums
Albums produced by Mitchell Froom
Albums recorded at A&M Studios
Albums recorded at United Western Recorders